A Flower's Broken is the fifth studio album by Italian pop singer Sabrina Salerno, released in 1999.

Album information 
In January 1999, A Flower's Broken – Sabrina's fifth album, produced by Enrico Monti and herself - was finally released in Italy and Spain by the RTI-Music label. Style-wise, the album saw Sabrina's return to electronic dance-pop, the type of music she has been known and loved for before she discarded this style for 1995's Maschio Dove Sei album. Only one single was released from this album – "I Love You". Unfortunately, both the album and the single were unsuccessful, and the album's music label RTI Music (controlled by Mediaset) was being sold at the same time of the album's release, and all marketing and promotion was stopped.

Track listings 
"Shallala"  – 3:20
"Jimmy"  – 4:08
"I Love You"  – 4:32
"Diamond in the Sand"  – 3:54
"I Want You"  – 3:49
"You Oughta Know"  – 3:59
"Flower's Broken"  – 4:32
"Love Is All There Is"  – 3:23
"Russian Lover" (with Dimitri Kusnitzof)  – 3:50
"Never Too Late"  – 9:43

References 

1999 albums
Sabrina Salerno albums